S. R. Bommai ministry was the Council of Ministers in Karnataka, a state in South India headed by S. R. Bommai of the Janata Party.

The ministry had multiple  ministers including the Chief Minister. All ministers belonged to the JP.

After Ramakrishna Hegde quit on moral grounds, Mr. Bommai took charge as Chief Minister of the State on 13 August 1988 and his government was dismissed by the then Governor, P. Venkatasubbaiah, on 21 April 1989. The dismissal was on the grounds that his government had lost its majority following large-scale defections engineered by several Janata Party leaders of the day. Bommai had sought some time from the Governor to prove his majority on the floor of the Legislature and he was denied this. He challenged this order in the Supreme Court.

S. R. Bommai v. Union of India was a landmark judgment of the Supreme Court of India, where the Court discussed at length, the provisions of Article 356 of the Constitution of India and related issues. The apex court spelt out restrictions on the centre's power to dismiss a state government under Article 356.  This case had huge impact on Centre-State Relations. Instances of imposition of President's rule have reduced after this judgement.

Chief Minister & Cabinet Ministers

Minister of State

See also
 Karnataka Legislative Assembly
 2019 Karnataka resignation crisis

References

Cabinets established in 1988
1988 establishments in Karnataka
1989 disestablishments in India
Bommai
Janata Party state ministries
Cabinets disestablished in 1989
1988 in Indian politics